Alceo Galliera (3 May 1910 – 21 April 1996) was a distinguished Italian conductor and composer. He was the son of Arnaldo Galliera (1871—1934) who taught in organ class at the Parma Conservatory.

Galliera was born in Milan in 1910 and studied piano, organ, and composition at the Milan Conservatory.

Among the orchestras he conducted were those of La Scala and the Santa Cecilia Academy in Rome. He conducted operas in which Maria Callas sang, as well as concerts with such great pianists as Arturo Benedetti Michelangeli and Dinu Lipatti. He also appeared at the Lucerne Festival where he conducted the Philharmonia Orchestra, and the Salzburg Festival with the Vienna Philharmonic. In 1950-51 he was the conductor of the Melbourne Symphony Orchestra (then known as the Victorian Symphony Orchestra).

As a conductor he was a gifted accompanist who achieved in establishing the necessary synergy. He accompanied Claudio Arrau, Dinu Lipatti, and Clara Haskil. He recorded also for the Philips label, a.o. Mozart Piano Concertos with Pianist Ingrid Haebler.

His compositions include 'Scherzo-Tarantella' and 'The Wise Virgins and the Foolish Virgins'.

Notes

1910 births
1996 deaths
Italian male conductors (music)
Milan Conservatory alumni
20th-century Italian conductors (music)
20th-century Italian male musicians